Jamshid Khan was a 17th-century Safavid military commander and official. Of "unclear origins", he was the son of a certain Hajji Manuchehr Khan, a gholam and sometime governor of Shirvan and Astarabad. Jamshid Khan served as the commander of the élite gholam corps (qollar-aghasi) in 1663–1667. He also served as the governor (hakem) of Semnan in 1646–1656, of Astarabad (beglarbeg) in 1656–1664, and of Qandahar (beglarbeg) sometime after 1663. 

Especially due to the high office of qollar-aghasi, Jamshid Khan yielded considerable influence in the Safavid state which was evident by the later tenure of grand vizier Mirza Mohammad Karaki (1661-1691), when the latters' power trailed that of Jamshid Khan. He died in 1667.

Notes

Sources
  
 
 
 
 

1667 deaths
Qollar-aghasi
Safavid governors of Semnan
Safavid governors of Astarabad
Safavid generals
Safavid governors of Qandahar
17th-century people of Safavid Iran